First Pull Up, Then Pull Down is the second album by Hot Tuna, released in 1971 as RCA Victor LSP-4550. The album was recorded live with electric instruments, instead of the acoustic instruments used on the previous album, Hot Tuna. The album rose to No. 43 on the Billboard charts. In 1996, RCA released the CD box set Hot Tuna in a Can, which included a remastered version of this album, along with remasters of the albums Hot Tuna, Burgers, America's Choice and Hoppkorv.
In Canada, the album reached No. 30 in the RPM Magazine charts where it was shown as Hot Tuna Electric Recorded Live.

Track listing

Personnel
Jack Casady – bass
Jorma Kaukonen – vocals, guitar
Papa John Creach – electric violin
Sammy Piazza – drums

Additional personnel
Will Scarlett – harmonica

Production
Pat "Maurice" Ieraci – master of the machines
Allen Zentz – engineer
Margareta Kaukonen – drawings
Mike Frankel – interior photograph
Jack Casady – pin-up photo
RCA – cage
Recorded at the Chateau Liberté, 22700 Old Santa Cruz Highway, Los Gatos, CA (in the Santa Cruz Mountains)
Mixed down at Wally Heider Studios, San Francisco
A Fishobaby Production

References

Hot Tuna live albums
1971 live albums
RCA Records live albums
Albums produced by Jorma Kraukonen